The Grammy Hall of Fame is a hall of fame to honor musical recordings of lasting qualitative or historical significance. Inductees are selected annually by a special member committee of eminent and knowledgeable professionals from all branches of the recording arts. It is compiled by The Recording Academy in the United States, and was established in 1973. Recordings (singles and albums) in all genres are eligible for selection, and must be over 25 years old to be considered. Additions to the list are chosen annually by a committee of recording arts professionals.

Alphabetical listing by title:
List of Grammy Hall of Fame Award recipients (A–D)
List of Grammy Hall of Fame Award recipients (E–I)
List of Grammy Hall of Fame Award recipients (J–P)
List of Grammy Hall of Fame Award recipients (Q–Z)

See also
Grammy Lifetime Achievement Award
Latin Grammy Hall of Fame Award
National Recording Registry

References

External links
Official website

Awards established in 1973
Hall of Fame
 
Music G
Music halls of fame